The Jutlandic Regiment of Foot was a Royal Danish Army infantry regiment. On 1 November 1961, it was amalgamated with the King's Regiment of Foot, to create the King's Jutlandic Regiment of Foot.

History
The Jutlandic Regiment of Foot could trace its history back to 1675. The Regiment participated in the Scanian War (1675–1679), Nine Years' War (1693), Great Northern War (1700), Great Northern War (1709–1720), Slaget på Reden (1801), First Schleswig War (1848–1850) and Second Schleswig War (1864). 

In 1961, the newly started 1st Jutlandic Brigade took over the Coat of Arms, an some of the History from Jutlandic Regiment of Foot

Names of the regiment

Standards

References
 Lærebog for Hærens Menige, Hærkommandoen, marts 1960

Danish Army regiments
Military units and formations established in 1675
Military units and formations disestablished in 1961